On the list of members of the Grand Council of Aargau (2021–2024) the members of the Grand Council of Aargau are listed, who were elected in the election on October 18, 2020 for the term 2021–2024. Resignations and those following are recorded in a further section.

Elected members of the Grand Council of Aargau October 18, 2021

Members resigned and replaced during the legislative period 2021–2024 

|}

External links 
 Results election October 18, 2020

References 

Aargau
Politics of Aargau